is a Japanese voice actor, narrator and YouTuber. He is affiliated with the agency INTENTION as of October 1, 2020. He is characterized by his calm and clear voice, and mainly plays roles ranging from teenage boys to men in their 30s. He has a wealth of experience in narration, but has also been active in animation and dubbing in many productions, such as Gray Fullbuster in Fairy Tail, Mumen Rider in One Punch Man, Gai Tsutsugami in Guilty Crown, Tatsuya Shiba in The Irregular at Magic High School, Karamatsu in Osomatsu-san, Graham Aker in Mobile Suit Gundam 00, Alto Saotome in Macross Frontier, Tomoya Okazaki in Clannad, Kyōsuke Kōsaka in Oreimo, Yoshiki Kishinuma in Corpse Party, Hotaro Oreki in Hyouka, Bruno Bucciarati in JoJo's Bizarre Adventure: Golden Wind, Tetsurō Kuroo in Haikyuu!!, Satoru Gojo in Jujutsu Kaisen, Tsukasa Shishio in Dr. Stone, Hawks in My Hero Academia, and Shigure Sohma in Fruits Basket (2019). On video games, he voiced Hazama and Yūki Terumi in BlazBlue, Sakon Shima in Sengoku Basara 4, Ryoma in Fire Emblem, Cid Raines in Final Fantasy XIII, Flamebringer in Arknights, and Fei Long in Street Fighter IV. He has also the famous dubbing roles for Chris Evans in the Marvel Cinematic Universe, as well for Liam Hemsworth in Hunger Games film series.

Biography
After graduating from high school, Nakamura moved to Tokyo to become a voice actor. He wanted to be a movie dubbing artist. He entered Yoyogi Animation Academy and started living in the dormitory. While enrolled, he played the role of a waiter in the drama CD Taishō Roman Zakkichō starring Takehito Koyasu. After moving on from Yoyogi Animation Academy, he worked at Production Tokyo Drama House, Toritori Office, and Sigma Seven, and is currently a member of INTENTION.

In 2001, he made his voice acting debut in the OVA D+VINE [LUV], and in the same year, he made his first regular TV anime role as Griffion and Ligeron in Dennō Bōkenki Webdiver. In 2006, he won the role of Rufus in the game Valkyrie Profile 2: Silmeria, and the following year in 2007, he won the role of Takaya Abe in Big Windup!. In the same year, he starred as Tomoya Okazaki in the TV anime Clannad.

In 2008, he won the 18th Best Male Voice Actor Award in Nonko and Nobita's Anime Scramble. In 2016, he was awarded the Voice Actor of the Year in the Person Category of the 3rd Yahoo! Search Awards.

In April 2020, Nakamura launched "Washagana TV" on YouTube with manga artist, Bukubu Ōkawa, as a composition writer. As a double personality with Mafia Kajita, he uploads videos of various genres such as unboxing, gaming, and valuable possession showcasing. He also welcomes guests for free talk, live streaming of new releases and enthusiast games, and membership-only streaming.

Filmography

Anime series

Anime films

Web animation

Live-action film

Tokusatsu

Drama CD

Aitsu no Daihonmei, Takahiko Satō
Amari Sensei no Karei na Seminar
angelica monologue, Sakutarō Hagiwara
Aitsu no Daihonmei, Takahiko Satou
Barajou no Kiss, Kaede Higa
Bokutachi to Chuuzai-san no 700-nichi Sensou, Saijō
Cherry Boy Sakuen, Momiji Nakakita
Corpse Party: Blood Covered, Yoshiki Kishinuma
DeadLock, Yūto Lenix
DeadHeat, Yūto Lenix
DeadShot, Yūto Lenix
Exoskull Zero, Kakugo
Fate/Prototype Special Drama CD(Christmas Murder Case), Archer
Fujoshi Rumi, Shunsuke Chiba
Hitomi Wo Sumashite, Shigeto Honda
Honto Yajuu, Tomoharu Ueda
Kaichou wa Maid-sama, Kurotatsu
Karneval, Jiki
Ketsuekigata Danshi, Hibiki Akabane
Kizuna IV, Harada
Koi ni Inochi wo Kakeru no sa, Tōru Miwasa
Kotoba Nante Iranai Series 1: Kotoba Nante Iranai, Keisuke Kazami
Kotoba Nante Iranai Series 2: Iki mo Dekinai kurai, Keisuke Kazami
Kuranoa, Shō Kitajima
Kuro Bara Alice, Dimitri Lewandowski
Kyuuso Ha Cheese no Yume Omiru, Kyōichi Ōtomi
Love Neco, Yabuki Eiji
Love Recipe ~Henna Essence~, Seiji Igarashi
Migawari Hakushaku no Bouken, Richard Radford
MR.MORNING, Miguel Wiseman
Koi ni Inochi wo Kakeru no sa, Tōru Misawa
Punch Up!, Kōta Ōki
Repeat After Me?, Nigel Rose
Rokujyoma no Shinryakusha!? ~Shirogane no Hime to Aoki Kishi~, Kōtarō Satomi/Reios Fatra Bertorion
Rossellini Ke no Musuko Ryakudatsusha, Eduard Rossellini
Ruri no Kaze ni Hana wa Nagareru, Kōya
Scarlet, Akio Kōzuki
Sekai-ichi Hatsukoi, Hatori Yoshiyuki
Sentimental Garden Lover, Taki
Seven Days: Monday - Thursday, Tōji Seryō
S.L.H - Stray Love Hearts!, Cain Kumoide
Soujo no Koi wa Nido Haneru, Ōtomi Kyōichi
Starry☆Sky, Kazuki Shiranui
Strobe Edge, Ren Ichinose
Suikoden, Flik
Suikoden II, Flik
Taiyō no Ie, Hiro Nakamura
Tindharia no Tane, Fizz Valerian
Voice Calendar Story of 365 days, GIN·RUMMY

Video games

Unknown date
Fate/stay night Réalta Nua: Take Off! Super Dimensional Trouble Hanafuda Epic Battle, Archer
Last Escort -Club Katze-, Rei, 
~miyako~, Seimei
Shitsuji Tachino Ren'ai Jijou, Wolfgang Leinsdorf
Konjiki no Gash Bell!!, Tsaoron

Dubbing

Live-action

Animation

References

External links
  
 Yuichi Nakamura at GamePlaza-Haruka Voice Acting Database 
 Yuichi Nakamura at Hitoshi Doi's Seiyuu Database
 
 
 
 

1980 births
21st-century Japanese male actors
Crunchyroll Anime Awards winners
Japanese male video game actors
Japanese male voice actors
Living people
Male voice actors from Kagawa Prefecture
Seiyu Award winners